Arish Ali Khan (born 20 December 2000) is a Pakistani cricketer. He was named in Pakistan's squad for the 2020 Under-19 Cricket World Cup. Prior to the 2020 Pakistan Super League, he was named as one of six local rookies to watch. He made his Twenty20 debut on 19 June 2021, for Quetta Gladiators in the 2021 Pakistan Super League, taking four wickets in the match.

References

External links
 

2000 births
Living people
Pakistani cricketers
Quetta Gladiators cricketers
Peshawar Zalmi cricketers
Place of birth missing (living people)